Chhan (or Chahan) is a village in Bagnotar Union Council, Abbottabad Tehsil, Abbottabad District, Khyber Pakhtunkhwa, Pakistan. According to the 2017 Census of Pakistan,   the population of Chhan is 2,234.

References

Populated places in Abbottabad District